David Robinson (born April 2, 1949) is an American rock drummer. He has performed with many rock bands, including the Rising Tide, the Modern Lovers, the Pop!, DMZ and the Cars. In 2018, Robinson was inducted into the Rock and Roll Hall of Fame as a member of the Cars.

Background
Born in Malden, Massachusetts, Robinson attended Woburn Memorial High School.

Robinson came up with the Cars' band name and is credited with designing the album covers.

After the breakup of the Cars, Robinson ran a restaurant and was an extra in several films, including Housesitter and The Crucible.

In 2010, Robinson reunited with the surviving original members of The Cars to record their first album in 24 years, titled Move Like This.  He had to relearn how to play the drums since (aside from loose jamming on the congas) he had stopped playing in 1987. After the completion of Move Like This, Robinson said that he would be interested in working on more studio albums.

As of August 2018, Robinson runs an art gallery in Rockport, Massachusetts, where he sells jewelry that he makes himself.

In 2020, Robinson appeared in an episode of Chasing Classic Cars where his 1969 De Tomaso Mangusta was restored.

References

1949 births
Living people
Album-cover and concert-poster artists
American rock drummers
American restaurateurs
The Modern Lovers members
The Cars members
American new wave musicians
New wave drummers
People from Woburn, Massachusetts
Musicians from Massachusetts
20th-century American drummers
American male drummers
Woburn Memorial High School alumni